Drot may refer to:

Jean-Marie Drot, French writer and documentary maker
Drot, pseudonym of Oleksander Tysovsky, founder of the Ukrainian Scouting organization Plast

See also
Drott (disambiguation)